Jackson Ford (born 17 February 1998) is an Australian professional rugby league footballer who plays as a  forward and  for the New Zealand Warriors in the NRL.

He previously played for the St. George Illawarra Dragons in the National Rugby League.

Background
Ford was born in Shellharbour, New South Wales, Australia.

He played his junior rugby league for the Gerringong Lions in the Group 7 Rugby League.

Playing career

2019
In Round 20 of the 2019 Canterbury Cup NSW competition, Ford scored 4 tries as St George Illawarra defeated the Wentworthville Magpies 36-16 at Kogarah Oval.  After this performance, Ford was called into the first grade team.

Ford made his first grade debut for St George Illawarra against the Gold Coast Titans in round 21 of the 2019 NRL season which ended in a 40-28 victory.
The following week against Cronulla-Sutherland, Ford scored his first try in the top grade as St George Illawarra lost the match 18-12 at Shark Park.

On 29 September 2019, Ford was named in the 2019 Canterbury Cup NSW team of the season for his performances throughout the year as St George Illawarra finished as the competition's minor premiers.

2020
Ford played a total of 12 games for St. George Illawarra in the 2020 NRL season as the club missed out on the finals.

2021 & 2022
Ford played a total of 11 matches for St. George Illawarra in the 2021 NRL season as the club finished 11th on the table and missed out on the finals, he made his long awaited return in the Round 24 win over the Wests Tigers scoring a try running 11 times for over 125 metres 20 tackles and an offload in the 37 minute stint.  
In September 2022, Ford was announced to have signed with the New Zealand Warriors on a two year deal, starting in 2023.

Statistics

References

External links
Dragons profile

1998 births
Living people
Australian rugby league players
Rugby league players from New South Wales
Rugby league second-rows
St. George Illawarra Dragons players
New Zealand Warriors players